Mine for Keeps is a 1962 book by the Canadian children's author Jean Little.  At the time she wrote Mine for Keeps, Little was teaching in a school for the disabled and she had written the book after becoming tired of reading her students books in which disabled child characters either meet deaths or recover completely (like Clara in Heidi, or Colin in The Secret Garden).

Overview
Born with cerebral palsy, nine-year-old Sally has spent the past five years at a special rehabilitation school. Her dreams of actually living with her family rather than just visiting them finally comes true when a new normal school opens near her family's home. Adjusting to her new life and the typical challenges of starting a new school and meeting new friends are heightened for Sally through the unique problems of being handicapped in the world.

References

1962 Canadian novels
Canadian children's novels
Works about cerebral palsy and other paralytic syndromes
Novels set in elementary and primary schools
Little, Brown and Company books
1962 children's books